The Ireland men's national field hockey team is organised by Hockey Ireland and represents both the Republic of Ireland and Northern Ireland in international men's field hockey competitions, including the Summer Olympics, the Men's Hockey World Cup and the EuroHockey Nations Championship. They have previously competed in the Men's Intercontinental Cup, the Hockey Champions Challenge, the Men's FIH Hockey World League and the FIH Hockey Series. On 26 January 1895 Ireland played in the  first ever international field hockey match when they defeated Wales 3–0 in Rhyl. Ireland were finalists and silver medallists at the 1908 Summer Olympics. Ireland were also bronze medallists at the 2015 Men's EuroHockey Nations Championship.

Early years
The Irish Hockey Union was founded on 6 February 1893 and on 26 January 1895 Ireland played in the first ever international field hockey match when they defeated Wales 3–0 in Rhyl. In 1895 Ireland also played England for the first time. This was also England's first ever international field hockey match. England's first four international matches, in 1895, 1896, 1897 and 1898, were all against Ireland. By the start of the First World War, Ireland had played 55 international matches, mostly against Wales, England or Scotland. This saw 605 individuals represent Ireland, at least 164 of whom were brothers. Amongst the most notable set of brothers were the Petersons, including Jack and Walter. In 1904 the Peterson brothers were members of the Ireland team that won the Triple Crown. Ireland won the title after defeating Wales 4–2 away and England 3–2 at home. As well as Jack and Walter, the team also included their brothers Nicholas, William and Cecil. Another brother, Herbert made two Ireland appearances between 1900 and 1902. In total the brothers won 66 caps between them.

Tournament history

Olympic Games
In 1908, with a team that included Jack and Walter Peterson, Ireland played in the very first Olympic field hockey tournament. After defeating Wales 3–1 in the semi-final, they lost 8–1 to England in the final. The Ireland team was part of the Great Britain at the 1908 Summer Olympics team. Because of this, the silver medal won by Ireland is credited to Great Britain and not Ireland. Ireland would have to wait 108 years before competing in their next Olympic tournament. In 1980 Ireland were invited to enter the tournament after a number of teams dropped out following the boycott. However the offer was turned down by the Irish Hockey Union due to the short notice. Shortly after it was proposed that Ireland apply to enter in 1984. However following a meeting on 16 May 1980 it was rejected due to opposition from the Ulster Branch. Ireland have entered Olympic qualifying tournaments since 1992. After narrowly missing out on qualification in both 2008 and 2012, Ireland qualified for the 2016 Summer Olympics after finishing fifth in the 2014–15 Men's FIH Hockey World League Semifinals. Australia's 3–2 victory over New Zealand in the 2015 Oceania Cup confirmed Ireland's qualification.

World Cup
Ireland qualified for the 1978 Men's Hockey World Cup after finishing as runners-up at the 1977 Men's Intercontinental Cup. The Ireland squad at their first World Cup included Terry Gregg, David Judge and Tommy Allen. Ireland qualified for the 1990 Men's Hockey World Cup after finishing fifth at the 1989 Men's Intercontinental Cup. The 1990 World Cup squad included Jimmy Kirkwood, Stephen Martin,  Billy McConnell and Martin Sloan. Ireland qualified for the 2018 Men's Hockey World Cup after finishing fifth in the 2016–17 Men's FIH Hockey World League Semifinals.

EuroHockey Championship
Ireland have played regularly in the EuroHockey Nations Championship. With a team that included Harry Cahill and David Judge, Ireland competed in the inaugural 1970 tournament. Ireland hosted the 1995 tournament. After finishing ninth in 2003, Ireland were relegated to the 2005 Men's EuroHockey Nations Trophy. After winning this tournament, Ireland were promoted to the 2007 Men's EuroHockey Nations Championship. After finishing seventh in 2007 Ireland were again relegated. However after winning the 2009 Men's EuroHockey Nations Trophy, they were promoted to the 2011 Men's EuroHockey Nations Championship. Ireland's best performance in the tournament came in 2015 when they won the bronze medal after beating the hosts, England, 4–2 in the third place play-off with goals from Shane O'Donoghue, Alan Sothern and Eugene Magee.

Men's Intercontinental Cup
Between 1977 and 2006 Ireland played regularly in the Men's Intercontinental Cup. Ireland qualified for the 1978 Men's Hockey World Cup after finishing as runners-up at the 1977 Men's Intercontinental Cup. With a team that included Jimmy Kirkwood, Stephen Martin,  Billy McConnell and Martin Sloan, Ireland qualified for the 1990 Men's Hockey World Cup after finishing fifth at the 1989 Men's Intercontinental Cup. After finishing ninth in the 1993 Men's Intercontinental Cup, Ireland were relegated to the 1996 Inter Nations Cup. After finishing fourth in this tournament they qualified for the 1997 Men's Intercontinental Cup.

Hockey Champions Challenge
Between 2009 and 2014 Ireland competed in the Hockey Champions Challenge. They initially played in the second level tournament. However after winning the 2011 Men's Hockey Champions Challenge II they were promoted to the 2012 Men's Hockey Champions Challenge I.

Hockey Champions Challenge I

Hockey Champions Challenge II

Men's FIH Hockey World League
Between 2012 and 2017 Ireland played in the Men's FIH Hockey World League. Ireland won World League tournaments in 2012, 2015 and 2017. Ireland qualified for the 2016 Summer Olympics after finishing fifth in the 2014–15 Men's FIH Hockey World League Semifinals. Ireland also qualified for the 2018 Men's Hockey World Cup after finishing fifth in the 2016–17 Men's FIH Hockey World League Semifinals.

FIH Hockey Series
During 2019, Ireland played in the FIH Hockey Series.

FIH Hockey Nations Cup

Invitational tournaments

Players

Current squad
The following 18 players were named on 23 August 2022 for the 2022 EuroHockey Championship Qualifier in Calais, France from 24 to 27 August 2022.

Caps updated as of 25 August 2022, after the match against France.

Recent call-ups
The following players have been called up for the national team in the last 12 months.

Olympians
London 1908

Rio 2016

The following Ireland internationals have also represented Great Britain at the Summer Olympics.

Coaches

Honours
Summer Olympics
Runners Up: 1908: 1
Men's EuroHockey Nations Trophy
Winners: 2005, 2009
Hamburg Masters
Winners: 2017 
Men's FIH Hockey World League Round 1
Winners: 2012 Cardiff
Men's FIH Hockey World League Round 2
Winners: 2015 San Diego, 2017 Belfast
Runners up: 2013 New Delhi
Men's FIH Series Finals
Runners up: 2019 Le Touquet
Men's Hockey Champions Challenge II
Winners: 2011
Runners up: 2009
Men's Field Hockey Olympic Qualifier
Runners up: 2012
Men's Hockey Investec Cup
Runners up: 2014
Men's Intercontinental Cup
Runners Up: 1977

References

External links
Official website
FIH profile

 
National team
European men's national field hockey teams
 
1895 establishments in Ireland